Staritsky (masculine), Staritskaya (feminine), or Staritskoye (neuter) is the name of several rural localities in Russia:
Staritskoye, Orenburg Oblast, a selo in Klyuchevsky Selsoviet of Belyayevsky District of Orenburg Oblast
Staritskoye, Saratov Oblast, a selo in Engelssky District of Saratov Oblast
Staritskaya, a village in Sannikovsky Rural Okrug of Tobolsky District of Tyumen Oblast